President Chiang may refer to:
Chiang Kai-shek (1887–1975), 1st president of the Republic of China
Chiang Ching-kuo  (1910–1988), 3rd president of the Republic of China and son of the 1st president